Polytrichum longisetum is a species of Polytrichaceae. It is found in cooler areas of both the Southern and Northern hemispheres.

References

Polytrichaceae
Flora of Michigan
Flora without expected TNC conservation status